Kangana Ranaut is an Indian actress and filmmaker who predominantly works in Hindi films, in addition to a few Tamil films. She has received four National Film Awards, five Filmfare Awards, three International Indian Film Academy Awards, and one award each from the Screen, Zee Cine, SIIMA, and Producers Guild award ceremonies.

Ranaut made her acting debut in 2006 with a leading role in the romantic thriller Gangster, winning the Filmfare Award for Best Female Debut. Her portrayals of a character based on actress Parveen Babi in  Woh Lamhe (2006) and a shrewd socialite in Life in a... Metro (2007) were lauded, with the latter earning her a Stardust Award for Breakthrough Performance – Female. She won the National Film Award for Best Supporting Actress and a Filmfare Award in the same category for playing a substance abusing supermodel in the drama Fashion (2008). Also in 2008, she featured in the Tamil film Dhaam Dhoom.

Ranaut featured in several commercially successful films, including the supernatural thriller Raaz: The Mystery Continues (2009), the crime film Once Upon a Time in Mumbaai (2010), the romantic comedy Tanu Weds Manu (2011), and the comedy Double Dhamaal (2011). For her role in Tanu Weds Manu, she received nominations for the Zee Cine and Screen Award for Best Actress. She followed this by playing brief roles in a series of box office flops that failed to propel her career forward. In 2013, Ranaut played Kaya, a shapeshifting mutant, in the science fiction film Krrish 3, which ranks among the highest-grossing Bollywood films. She received an IIFA Award for Best Supporting Actress nomination for it. Ranaut garnered critical acclaim for starring in the coming-of-age film Queen (2014), for which she also co-wrote the dialogues. She won several awards for Queen, including the National Film Award and the Filmfare Award for Best Actress. She received a Filmfare Critics Award and a second consecutive National Film Award for Best Actress for her performance.

This success was followed by a series of commercially failed films, which led to a decline in Ranaut's stardom. Her sole commercial success came with the 2019 period drama Manikarnika: The Queen of Jhansi, which she also co-directed. Her portrayal of freedom fighter Rani of Jhansi in it and a kabaddi player in the 2020 sports drama Panga jointly won her another National Film Award for Best Actress. Her portrayal of J. Jayalalithaa in the biopic Thalaivii (2021) won her a SIIMA Award for Best Actress – Tamil. In 2022, Ranaut hosted the streaming reality show Lock Upp to strong viewership.

Film

Television

Awards and nominations

Footnotes

References

External links
 
 Kangana Ranaut on Bollywood Hungama

Indian filmographies
Actress filmographies
Lists of awards received by Indian actor